Amalosia jacovae, also known commonly as the clouded gecko or the clouded velvet gecko, is a species of lizard in the family Diplodactylidae. The species is endemic to Australia.

Etymology
The specific name, jacovae (Latin, feminine, genitive singular), is in honor of Australian herpetologist Jeanette Adelaide Covacevich ( j + a + cov + suffix -ae).

Geographic range
A. jacovae is found in southeastern Queensland, Australia.

Habitat
The preferred natural habitats of A. jacovae are forest and shrubland, but it has also been found in houses.

Description

Reproduction
A. jacovae is oviparous.

References

Further reading
Cogger, Harold G. (2014). Reptiles and Amphibians of Australia, Seventh Edition. Clayton, Victoria, Australia: CSIRO Publishing. xxx + 1,033 pp. .
Couper, Patrick J.; Keim, Lauren D.; Hoskin, Conrad J. (2007). "A new velvet Gecko (Gekkonidae: Oedura) from south-east Queensland, Australia". Zootaxa 1587: 27–41. (Oedura jacovae, new species).
Oliver, Paul M.; Bauer, Aaron M.; Greenbaum, Eli; Jackman, Todd; Hobbie, Tara (2012). "Molecular phylogenetics of the arboreal Australian gecko genus Oedura Gray 1842 (Gekkota: Diplodactylidae): Another plesiomorphic grade ?" Molecular Phylogenetics and Evolution 63 (2): 255–264). (Amalosia jacovae, new combination).
Wilson, Steve; Swan, Gerry (2013). A Complete Guide to Reptiles of Australia, Fourth Edition. Sydney, New Holland Publishers. 522 pp. .

Amalosia
Geckos of Australia
Reptiles of Queensland
Endemic fauna of Australia
Reptiles described in 2007
Taxa named by Patrick J. Couper
Taxa named by Lauren D. Keim
Taxa named by Conrad J. Hoskin